Smart materials, also called intelligent or responsive materials, are designed materials that have one or more properties that can be significantly changed in a controlled fashion by external stimuli, such as stress, moisture, electric or magnetic fields, light, temperature, pH, or chemical compounds. Smart materials are the basis of many applications, including sensors and actuators, or artificial muscles, particularly as electroactive polymers (EAPs).
  
Terms used to describe smart materials include shape memory material (SMM) and shape memory technology (SMT).

Types

There are a number of types of smart material, of which are already common. Some examples are as following:
 Piezoelectric materials are materials that produce a voltage when stress is applied. Since this effect also applies in a reverse manner, a voltage across the sample will produce stress within sample. Suitably designed structures made from these materials can, therefore, be made that bend, expand or contract when a voltage is applied.
Shape-memory alloys and shape-memory polymers are materials in which large deformation can be induced and recovered through temperature changes or stress changes (pseudoelasticity). The shape memory effect results due to respectively martensitic phase change and induced elasticity at higher temperatures.
 Photovoltaic materials or optoelectronics convert light to electrical current.
 Electroactive polymers (EAPs) change their volume by voltage or electric fields.  
 Magnetostrictive materials exhibit a change in shape under the influence of magnetic field and also exhibit a change in their magnetization under the influence of mechanical stress.
 Magnetic shape memory alloys are materials that change their shape in response to a significant change in the magnetic field.
 Smart inorganic polymers showing tunable and responsive properties.
 pH-sensitive polymers are materials that change in volume when the pH of the surrounding medium changes.
 Temperature-responsive polymers are materials which undergo changes upon temperature.
 Halochromic materials are commonly used materials that change their color as a result of changing acidity. One suggested application is for paints that can change color to indicate corrosion in the metal underneath them.
 Chromogenic systems change color in response to electrical, optical or thermal changes. These include electrochromic materials, which change their colour or opacity on the application of a voltage (e.g., liquid crystal displays), thermochromic materials change in colour depending on their temperature, and photochromic materials, which change colour in response to light—for example, light-sensitive sunglasses that darken when exposed to bright sunlight.
 Ferrofluids are magnetic fluids (affected by magnets and magnetic fields).
 Photomechanical materials change shape under exposure to light.
 Polycaprolactone (polymorph) can be molded by immersion in hot water.
 Self-healing materials have the intrinsic ability to repair damage due to normal usage, thus expanding the material's lifetime.
 Dielectric elastomers (DEs) are smart material systems which produce large strains (up to 500%) under the influence of an external electric field.
 Magnetocaloric materials are compounds that undergo a reversible change in temperature upon exposure to a changing magnetic field.
 Smart self-healing coatings heal without human intervention.
 Thermoelectric materials are used to build devices that convert temperature differences into electricity and vice versa.
 Chemoresponsive materials change size or volume under the influence of external chemical or biological compound.

Smart materials have properties that react to changes in their environment. This means that one of their properties can be changed by an external condition, such as temperature, light, pressure, electricity, voltage, pH, or chemical compounds. This change is reversible and can be repeated many times.
There is a wide range of different smart materials. Each offer different properties that can be changed. Some materials are very good and cover a huge range of the scales.

See also 
 Smart polymer
 Programmable matter
 Sensors
 Actuators
 Artificial muscles
 Thermally induced shape-memory effect (polymers)

References

External links 
Smart Materials Book Series, Royal Society of Chemistry

 
Artificial materials